Michèle Torr (born Michelle Cléberte Tort 7 April 1947) is a French singer and author, best known in non-Francophone countries for her participation in the Eurovision Song Contest for Luxembourg in 1966 and for Monaco in 1977.

Early career 
Born in Pertuis, Vaucluse, Torr won her first singing contest at age fifteen, in 1962, winning the first year's On Chante dans mon Quartier contest in Avignon. Michèle was a tall beautiful woman with actress-like expression, and easily wins the audience over by singing the Édith Piaf song Exodus. Mireille Mathieu was runner-up that year with Les cloches de Lisbonne by Maria Candido. Then in 1963, at age sixteen, Michèle won a recording contract with the Mercury label, and opened for Jacques Brel at the Paris Olympia. She released three EPs (four songs each) throughout 1964, which were aimed at radio and juke-box play. Torr's release of Dans mes bras, oublie ta peine in 1964 was a big hit. Further releases of both original French material, and French covers of British and American hits, proved to be hit and miss. This setting the tone for Torr's career throughout the 60's, as she tried to find her niche. The Mercury contract ended in 1972.

Eurovision Song Contest appearances 
In 1966, Torr was invited to perform the Luxembourgish entry, Ce soir je t'attendais, at the eleventh Eurovision Song Contest. This was permitted as there has never been a requirement at Eurovision for the singer to be native to the country they represent; indeed Luxembourg only very rarely chose a Luxembourger as their performer. As Luxembourg had won the 1965 contest, the 1966 contest was held in Luxembourg City on 5 March. Torr wound up finishing joint-tenth out of eighteen participants, alongside the entries from Finland and Germany.

Eleven years later, in 1977, Torr again took part in Eurovision, this time representing Monaco with the song Une petite française. The 1977 contest took place in London on 7 May, and Torr improved on her previous result, finishing fourth of eighteen participants.

In between her two Eurovision appearances, Torr had also taken part in the French Eurovision pre-selection in 1970 with two songs, but had not progressed beyond the semi-final stage.

Later career 
Torr had continued to record and release singles during the early and mid 1970s like Une vague bleue, a big hit, but she achieved the biggest successes of her career at the end of the decade with Emmène-moi danser ce soir, La séparation and Discomotion. Through the 1980s she continued to release successful singles and albums and was a regular on television. Her career stalled in the 1990s, with much less new material being released, although compilations of earlier work kept her in the public eye.

On 3 March 2008, she released her album Ces années-là on the Sony BMG Import label.

On 12 November 2012, she released an album of religious songs Chanter c'est Prier on the Sony Music France S.M.A.R.T. label.

As of 2015, She continues to tour worldwide on the French music nostalgia circuit, with almost a concert a month.

Decorations 
 Commander of the Order of Arts and Letters (2016)

Discography

45s
 Les Amoureux et Piano va l'amour  1973 
 Une vague bleue
Je m'appelle Michèle
 :fr:Cette fille c'était moi  1975 
 Ce soir je t'attendais (Eurovision) 1976
 Une petite Française (Eurovision) 1977
 :fr:Emmène-moi danser ce soir 1978 
 J'aime  1978 
 Chanson inédite 1979 
 Lui (1980)
 :fr:J'en appelle à la tendresse  1981 
 Midnight blue en Irlande  1983 
 Adieu  1983 
 Donne moi la main, donne moi l'amour  1984

Albums

 1964: Dans mes bras oublie ta peine
 1965: Dis-moi maintenant
 1966: Ce soir je t'attendais
 1970: tous les oiseaux reviennent
 1974: un disque d'amour
 1976: je m'appelle Michèle
 1976: Michele Torr
 1977: j'aime
 1978: Emmène moi danser ce soir
 1979: chanson inédite
 1980: à l'Olympia
 1980: Lui
 1981: j'en appelle à la tendresse
 1982: Olympia
 1983: adieu/à mon père
 1983: midnight blue en Irlande
 1983: Adieu Disc'Az 478
 1984: donne-moi le matin, donne-moi l'amour
 1985: Michèle Torr
 1986: Qui
 1987: chansons de toujours
 1987: I remember you
 1988: je t'avais rapporté
 1988: Argentina
 1990: la compil' de mes succès
 1991: vague à l'homme
 1993: à mi vie
 1995: à nos beaux jours
 1996: le meilleur de Michele Torr en public
 1997: seule
 1998: portrait de scène
 1998: Michele Torr 2cd
 1999: emmene moi danser ce soir en public
 2000: une petite française 3cd
 2001: acoustique
 2001: best of
 2002: donner
 2003: à l'Olympia 2003: chante Piaf 2004: en concert 2005: à l'Olympia 2006: la louve 2007: ces années là 2008: Olympia 2010: triple best of 2011: Olympia 2012: chanter c'est prier 2013: Herbert Léonard / Michele Torr au Québec 2014: diva 2016: tout l'amour du mondeOthers
2012: Chanter c'est prier''

Books 
 1999: La Cuisine (provençale) de ma mère by Michèle Torr
 2005: la Couleur des mots (autobiography) by Michèle Torr, and Laurent Fialaix

See also
 France Gall
 Françoise Hardy
 Sylvie Vartan
 Sheila

References

External links 
 Official website
 Discography and cover art at Encyclopédisque.fr
 Officier de l’Ordre des Arts et des Lettres 2002

1947 births
Living people
People from Pertuis
French women singers
Eurovision Song Contest entrants for Luxembourg
Eurovision Song Contest entrants for Monaco
Eurovision Song Contest entrants of 1966
Eurovision Song Contest entrants of 1977
Commandeurs of the Ordre des Arts et des Lettres